French singer-songwriter Renaud's second unnamed studio album is commonly known as Laisse béton, although it is sometimes referred to as Place de ma mob after the wall inscription on the album cover. It was released in 1977 by Polydor Records. The title is verlan for "laisse tomber" ("drop it, forget about it", lit. "let it fall").

Track listing
All songs were written by Renaud Séchan except where noted.

Side one
 "Laisse béton" – 2:30
 "Le blues de la Porte d'Orléans" – 3:10
 "La chanson du loubard" (Muriel Huster, Renaud Séchan) – 2:35
 "Je suis une bande de jeunes" (Renaud Séchan, François Bernheim) – 3:00
 "Adieu Minette" – 3:48
 "Les charognards" – 4:22

Side two
 "Jojo le démago" – 2:26
 "Buffalo débile" – 2:19
 "La boum" – 3:00
 "Germaine" – 3:15
 "Mélusine" – 1:37
 "La bande à Lucien" – 2:52

Tracks 1 and 3 were included on the compilation The Meilleur of Renaud (75–85). Track 1 was also included on the CD Ma Compil. Tracks 1, 4 and 5 were covered for the tribute album La Bande à Renaud.

Personnel
Renaud – vocals, lead guitar
Alain Le Douarin – guitar
Patrice Caratini – double bass
Alain Labacci – guitar, banjo
Joss Baselli – accordion, bandoneón
Christian Lété – percussion
Jean-Jacques Milteau – harmonica
Technical
Georges Blumenfeld - recording, mixing
David Séchan - photography

References

1977 albums
Renaud albums
Polydor Records albums